APICS, currently known as the Association for Supply Chain Management is a not-for-profit international education organization offering certification programs, training tools, and networking opportunities to increase workplace performance.  Formed in 1957, the mission of the organization is to advance end-to-end supply chain management. APICS merged with the Supply-Chain Council in 2014, and the American Society of Transportation and Logistics in 2015.

History

In 1957, 20 production control managers in various industries formed the American Production and Inventory Control Society.  The organization later became an international association known as APICS.  The organization offers certification programs, training tools, and networking opportunities for the purpose of increasing workplace performance in the supply chain.

The Supply-Chain Council (SCC) merged into APICS on 5 August 2014. APICS also merged with the American Society of Transportation and Logistics (AST&L) in 2015.

The Historical Supply-Chain Council 
The Supply-Chain Council (SCC) formed in 1996 as an independent non-profit organization by industry research firm AMR Research (AMR) and consulting firm Pitiglio, Rabin, Todd and McGrath (PRTM), with membership made up of by a variety of industries, including manufacturing, service, distribution, and retailing. The original mission was to define a common language to describe and model supply chains. SCC developed the Supply-Chain Operations Reference (SCOR)-model process for chain management. The original framework for the SCOR model was developed in a collaboration between AMR and PRTM and vetted with industry-leading companies including Intel, IBM, Rockwell Semiconductor, and Procter and Gamble. The original model was designed describe supply chains in four basic processes: Plan, Source, Make and Deliver. The Return process was added later to accommodate remanufacturing industries and eCommerce.

Certifications
APICS historically offered several professional designations: CPIM, CSCP, and CLTD.  Under ASCM, additional certificate programs are being created including The Supply Chain Procurement Certificate (SCPC) and The Supply Chain Warehousing Certificate (SCWC).

CPIM
The "APICS Certified in Production and Inventory Management" or "APICS CPIM" designation is a professional certification offered by APICS. The program was founded in 1973. Since its inception, more than 100,000 people have earned the APICS CPIM designation. APICS CPIM designees learn terminology, concepts, and strategies related to demand management, procurement and supplier planning, material requirements planning, capacity requirements planning, sales and operations planning, master scheduling, performance measurements, supplier relationships, quality control, and continuous improvement.

CSCP
The APICS Certified Supply Chain Professional, or APICS CSCP, demonstrates professional knowledge and organizational skills for developing more streamlined operations. Since its launch in 2006, more than 24,000 professionals in 100 countries have earned the CSCP designation.

CLTD
The APICS Certified Logistics, Transportation and Distribution, or APICS CLTD, demonstrates in-depth knowledge of a range of supply chain logistics topics. More than 1,000 professionals have earned their CLTDs since the program launched in 2016.

SCWC
The Supply Chain Warehousing Certificate will be available Fall 2021.

Publications
SCM Now is the official publication of the organization, which was formerly called the APICS Magazine

Notes

References

External links
 

1957 establishments in Ohio
Business and finance professional associations
Organizations based in Chicago
Organizations established in 1957
Professional associations based in the United States